Adelaide City FC is a soccer club based in Adelaide, South Australia. Founded in 1946 by a community of post-war Italian immigrants, the club has become one of Australia's most decorated teams, having won the Oceania Club Championship, three national championships, three national cups, and 19 state championships.

This is a list of all seasons played by Adelaide City Football Club, from their first entry into SASFA Division Two in 1946 to their last completed season in 2022. It details the club's performance in every major competition entered.

Seasons

During Adelaide City's tenure in the National Soccer League from 1977 until 2003, the club often fielded a second team in South Australian competitions, with limited success.

References

Australian soccer club seasons